

Publications

2010

2011

2012

2013

2014

2015

2016

2017

2018

2019

Notes

References